Lieutenant General Erik Gustaf af Edholm (6November 1878 – 16February 1954) was a Swedish Army officer. His senior commands include commanding officer of the Södermanland Regiment, the Eastern Brigade and the III Army Division.

Career
af Edholm was born on 6 November 1878 in Stockholm, Sweden, the son of the First Marshal of the Court Erik Wilhelm af Edholm and his wife Emma Mariana Charlotta (née Braunerhielm). He passed mogenhetsexamen in Stockholm in 1897 and was a volunteer at Svea Life Guards (I 1) in 1897.

Career
af Edholm was promoted to sergeant in 1898, attended the Royal Military Academy in 1898 and was promoted to colour sergeant in 1899. He became an officer in 1899 and became underlöjtnant in the Svea Life Guards (I 1) the same year. af Edholm attended the Royal Swedish Army Staff College from 1902 to 1904 and was lieutenant in the General Staff in 1908.

He was promoted to captain in 1912 and served as a military attaché in the Hellenic Army and in the Montenegrin Army during the Balkan Wars from 1912 to 1913. af Edholm conducted military studies in the Italian Army in Tripoli in 1913. He was teacher of tactics at the Royal Swedish Army Staff College from 1912 to 1917 and became secretary in the Committee Against Opposition to National Defence Propaganda (Kommittén mot försvarsfientlig propaganda) and was promoted to major in 1920. af Edholm Chief of Staff of the IV Army Division (IV. arméfördelningen) from 1920 to 1923 and became battalion commander of Svea Life Guards (I 1) in 1923. He was head and leader in chemical agent safety courses from 1925 to 1928 and in 1933.

af Edholm was promoted to lieutenant colonel at Västerbotten Regiment (I 20) and was promoted to colonel in the Swedish Army and was appointed acting regimental commander of Södermanland Regiment (I 10) in 1928. He was appointed to regimental commander of Södermanland Regiment (I 10) in 1929 and stayed in this position until 1935. He conducted military studies in Italy in 1931 and was commanded to the Saar Territory in 1934. af Edholm became commander of the Eastern Brigade in 1935 and was promoted to major general in 1936. He was commander of the III Army Division from 1937 to 1942 before retiring and placed in the reserve as lieutenant general in 1944.

Personal life
In 1918 he married Thyra Amanda Steinwall (born 28 March 1898), the daughter of accountant Lennart Steinwall and Agnes (née Bergstrand). He was the father of Marianne Agnes Elisabeth (1919–2012), Margaretha Emma Thyra (1921–2006) and Erik af Edholm (1923–2009). He died in 1954 and was buried in Solna cemetery.

Dates of rank
1898 – Sergeant
1899 – Fanjunkare
1899 – Underlöjtnant
1908 – Lieutenant
1912 – Captain
1920 – Major
1926 – Lieutenant colonel
1928 – Colonel
1936 – Major general
1944 – Lieutenant general

Awards and decorations
af Edholm's awards:

Swedish
   Commander Grand Cross of the Order of the Sword

Foreign
  Commander 1st Class of the Order of the White Rose of Finland
  Grand Officer of the Order of the Three Stars
  Grand Officer of the Order of the Lithuanian Grand Duke Gediminas
  Commander 1st Class of the Order of Polonia Restituta
  Commander of the Order of the Crown of Italy
  Commander of the Order of St. Olav
  Officer of the Order of Prince Danilo I
  Officer of the Order of Orange-Nassau with swords
  Officer of the Order of Glory
  Greek campaign medal

Honours
Member of the Royal Swedish Academy of War Sciences

Bibliography

References

1878 births
1954 deaths
Swedish Army lieutenant generals
Military personnel from Stockholm
Members of the Royal Swedish Academy of War Sciences
Commanders Grand Cross of the Order of the Sword
Swedish military attachés